Jeremias Kalandula Chitunda (February 20, 1942 – November 2, 1992) served as the Vice President of UNITA until his assassination in Luanda, as part of the Halloween Massacre shortly after the first round of the presidential election, held on September 29–30. He was UNITA's second in command, after UNITA leader Jonas Savimbi.

Schooling
Chitunda, born in Chimbuelengue to Emilio Chitunda and Rosalina Kalombo, attended Chimbuelengue and Dondi Mission school in Bela Vista before proceeding to João de Castro College and the Huambo National Secondary School. He later received a scholarship to attend the University of Arizona, where he obtained a degree in mining engineering.

Political career
Chitunda moved from Angola to Zaire, fearing arrest by the Portuguese colonial authorities. He joined UNITA in 1966 and served as its representative to the U.S. southwest before being promoted to representative to the U.S. in 1976. He became the Vice President of UNITA in August 1986 at the sixth party congress.

Assassination
In 1992, after decades of war between UNITA and the governing MPLA, the first Presidential elections were scheduled. José Eduardo dos Santos officially received 49.57% of the vote and UNITA leader Jonas Savimbi won 40.6%. Because no candidate received 50% or more of the vote, election law dictated a second round of voting between the top two contenders.

Savimbi, along with many other election observers, said the election had been neither free nor fair. But he sent Chitunda, then Vice President of UNITA, and Elias Salupeto Pena, a UNITA senior advisor, to Luanda to negotiate the terms of the second round.

The election process broke down on October 31 when government troops in Luanda attacked UNITA. Civilians, using guns they had received from police a few days earlier, conducted house-by-house raids with the Rapid Intervention Police, killing and detaining hundreds of UNITA supporters. The government took civilians in trucks to the Camama cemetery and Morro da Luz ravine, shot them, and buried them in mass graves. On November 2, 1992, assailants attacked Chitunda's convoy, pulling him and another UNITA official from their car and shooting both of them in their faces.

State-run television displayed the bodies of Chitunda and Pena. To this date, their bodies have not been returned to their families for burial and their whereabouts have not been released by the Angolan government.

See also
List of unsolved murders

References

1942 births
1990s murders in Angola
1992 crimes in Angola
1992 deaths
1992 murders in Africa
20th-century Angolan people
Angolan politicians
Angolan rebels
Assassinated Angolan politicians
Deaths by firearm in Angola
Members of UNITA
People from Uíge Province
People murdered in Angola
People of the Angolan Civil War
UNITA politicians
University of Arizona alumni
Unsolved murders in Angola
Angolan revolutionaries